Dichelesthiidae is a family of copepods belonging to the order Siphonostomatoida.

Genera:
 Anthosoma Leach, 1816
 Dichelesthium Hermann, 1804
 Kabatarina Cressey & Boxshall, 1989

References

Copepods